Iñigo Vicente Elorduy (born 6 January 1998) is a Spanish professional footballer who plays as a left winger for Racing de Santander.

Club career
Born in Derio, Biscay, Basque Country, Vicente started his career at Athletic Bilbao's Lezama academy in 2008. He left the club in 2012 and joined Danok Bat CF, but returned in June of the following year.

Vicente made his senior debut with the farm team in the 2015–16 season, in Tercera División, before being promoted to the reserves in July 2017. On 21 December 2018, he signed a contract extension with the Lions until 2023.

On 6 August 2019, Vicente was loaned to Segunda División newcomers CD Mirandés, for one year. He made his professional debut on 17 August, starting in a 2–2 away draw against Rayo Vallecano.

Vicente scored his first professional goal on 9 November 2019, netting the opener in a 2–0 home defeat of Extremadura UD. He returned to Athletic in July 2020, after scoring three goals in 34 appearances, and was assigned to the main squad.

Vicente made first team – and La Liga – debut for the Lions on 1 October 2020, appearing as a second half substitute in a 1–0 home defeat to Cádiz CF. The following 1 July, he returned to Mirandés again on a one-year loan deal.

On 14 July 2022, Vicente moved to Racing de Santander, newly-promoted to the second division, on a three-year deal.

International career
Vicente made his debut for the unofficial Basque Country national team in May 2019, in a 0–0 draw away to Panama for which a small, youthful and inexperienced squad was selected.

Career statistics

Club

References

External links

1998 births
Living people
Sportspeople from Biscay
People from Greater Bilbao
Footballers from the Basque Country (autonomous community)
Spanish footballers
Association football wingers
La Liga players
Segunda División players
Segunda División B players
Tercera División players
Danok Bat CF players
CD Basconia footballers
Athletic Bilbao footballers 
Bilbao Athletic footballers
CD Mirandés footballers
Racing de Santander players
Basque Country international footballers